Cychrus elongatulus is a species of ground beetle in the subfamily of Carabinae. It was described by Deuve in 2001.

References

elongatulus
Beetles described in 2001